The Myth is a 2010 Chinese television series based on the 2005 Hong Kong film of the same title. Jackie Chan, who starred in the original film, was credited as the producer for the series, while Stanley Tong, who directed the film, was the creative director for the series. The series was first aired on CCTV-8 in China in January 2010.

Synopsis
Yi Xiaochuan finds a tiger pendant by coincidence and the pendant sears a mark onto his chest when he wears it on his neck. Meanwhile, Xiaochuan's elder brother, Yi Dachuan, discovers a 2,000-year-old treasure box at an excavation site. Xiaochuan unlocks the box with his pendant and opens a time portal by accident. Unknown to everyone else, he is transported back in time to the Qin dynasty together with Gao Yao, his girlfriend's brother.

Back in history, Xiaochuan meets the historical figures Xiang Yu and Liu Bang, and becomes sworn brothers with them. He encounters the Qin general Meng Tian, who mistakes him for his long-lost younger brother Meng Yi, because the mark of the pendant belongs to only members of the Meng clan. Xiaochuan also meets Princess Yushu of the tribal kingdom Tu'an, and she becomes the new love of his life. However, the lovers are unable to be together, as Yushu has become the Qin emperor's concubine in exchange for peace between the Qin Empire and Tu'an. Xiaochuan is unwilling to give up and he meets Yushu in secret inside the palace.

On the other hand, Gao Yao is separated from Xiaochuan and sent to the palace, where he is forcefully castrated and becomes a eunuch. After enduring humiliation and bullying, he wins the favour of the emperor through his excellent culinary skills and becomes a high-ranking official. He is renamed to "Zhao Gao" and starts abusing his authority by seeking vengeance on those he perceived to be responsible for his plight. Zhao Gao is gradually corrupted by power and turns against his old buddy Xiaochuan, whom he sees as a threat to his plans for dominating the Qin Empire.

In the present day, Dachuan, Gao Lan (Xiaochuan's girlfriend), and Dachuan's parents, work closely together to open the treasure box. Following clues from the box's engravings and a map, they need to embark on a treasure hunt to find the five secret keys to unlock the box. However, a mysterious masked man in black is also after the box's contents and he sends his henchmen to harass them.

Cast
Main cast
 Hu Ge as Yi Xiaochuan, a freelance photographer who travels back in time to the Qin dynasty. He is renamed to Meng Yi and becomes a general in the Qin army.
 Michelle Bai as Yushu, the princess of Tu'an who is forced to become Qin Shi Huang's concubine. She is Meng Yi's love interest.
 Chang Shih as Gao Yao, Gao Lan's elder brother and a celebrity chef. He travels back in time with Yi Xiaochuan and becomes a eunuch in the Qin palace and renames himself Zhao Gao.
 Zhang Meng as Gao Lan, Yi Xiaochuan's girlfriend, who becomes Yi Dachuan's love interest after Xiaochuan's disappearance. Zhang simultaneously played Xiaoyue, a Qin palace maid who becomes Xiang Yu's lover Consort Yu.
 Ren Quan as Yi Dachuan, Yi Xiaochuan's elder brother and an archaeologist.
 Li Yixiang as Liu Bang, Meng Yi's other sworn brother. He defeats Xiang Yu in the Chu–Han Contention and becomes the founding emperor of the Han dynasty.
 Chen Zihan as Lü Zhi, Liu Bang's wife.
 Tan Kai as Xiang Yu, Meng Yi's sworn brother. He proclaims himself Hegemon-King of Western Chu and fights with Liu Bang for sovereignty over China.
 Jin Sha as Lü Su, Lü Zhi's younger sister and Meng Yi's first love interest.
 Allen Ting as Meng Tian, a Qin general who claims that Yi Xiaochuan is his long-lost younger brother Meng Yi.

Supporting cast
 Xu Min as Yi Suochang, Dachuan and Xiaochuan's father.
 Xu Di as Dachuan and Xiaochuan's mother, an expert locksmith and a descendant of the Metal element keeper.
 Zhao Cong as Luo La, a follower of the masked man and a descendant of the Fire element keeper.
 Chen Qiguo as Lü Gong, the father of Lü Zhi and Lü Su.
 Zhou Yemang as Fan Zeng, an advisor to Xiang Liang and Xiang Yu.
 Dong Ziwu as Xiang Liang, Xiang Yu's uncle and a prominent rebel leader.
 Yang Shutian as Cui Wenzi, an eccentric physician.
 Yizhen as General Jin, a general of Tu'an.
 Wei Lai as Lady Meng Jiang
 Zhu Hongtao as Fan Qiliang, a labourer and Lady Meng Jiang's husband.
 Zang Jinsheng as Qin Shi Huang, the emperor of the Qin dynasty.
 Ma Wenlong as Fusu, the Qin crown prince and a student of Meng Tian. Ma simultaneously played a present-day artist who is revealed to be the descendant of the Water element keeper.
 Liu Xiaoxi as Li Si, the Qin chancellor.
 Shi Tianshuo as Li You, a Qin general and Li Si's son.
 Liu Dong as General Pang, Meng Tian's subordinate.
 Zhang Wei as Gao Jianli, a friend of Jing Ke. He attempts to assassinate Qin Shi Huang but fails.
 Liu Xuan as Xiang Zhuang, Xiang Yu's cousin.
 Zhang Chunzhong as Zhongli Mo, a general under Xiang Yu.
 Meng Qi as Huhai, the future second emperor of Qin.
 Tong Xiaohu as the keeper of the Night Glow Pearl.
 Wang Ju as Squad leader Tian, who leads the espionage mission to cripple Xiongnu forces.
 Li Lie as Palikuo, the Xiongnu leader. Li simultaneously played Eunuch Shan.
 Gao Liang as the masked man in black, who is after the treasure box.
 Jiang Xiuzhen as Qingqing, a tour guide who is revealed to be the descendant of the Earth element keeper.
 Dong Kefei as Sanbao, Meng Yi's subordinate who later joins Zhao Gao but remains faithful to Meng.
 Song Xinjie as Dexiang, a Xiongnu spy who becomes Meng Yi's servant.
 Wang Zhixia as the queen of Tu'an and mother of Yushu.
 Gao Yuanfeng, Peng Zhi, and Li Bing as Guisha, Tiansha, and Disha respectively, three hooligans from Guandong hired by Zhao Gao.
 Yan Yanlong and Shi Guodong as Ye Feng and Ma Ge respectively, the masked man's henchmen.
 Li Biqu as the descendant of the Wood element keeper.

Soundtrack
 Chuanyue (穿越; Time Travel) by Zhang Meng and Wang Haixiang
 Jide Caihong (記得彩虹; Remember the Rainbow) by Zhang Meng
 Liuzi Ge (六字歌; Six Character Song) performed by Chen Jiafeng and Wang Yan
 Xingyue Shenhua (星月神話; Myth of the Stars and Moon) by Jin Sha
 Meili De Shenhua (美麗的神話; Beautiful Myth) by Hu Ge and Michelle Bai

Awards

External links
  The Myth official website
  The Myth on Sina.com
 

2010 Chinese television series debuts
2010 Chinese television series endings
Cultural depictions of Qin Shi Huang
Television series set in the Qin dynasty
Chinese time travel television series
Chinese historical television series
China Central Television original programming